The Parliament of Northern Ireland was the home rule legislature created under the Government of Ireland Act 1920, which existed from 7 June 1921 to 30 March 1972, when it was suspended. It was subsequently abolished under the Northern Ireland Constitution Act 1973.

The second Government or Executive Committee of the Privy Council of Northern Ireland was led by J. M. Andrews, who was Prime Minister from 25 November 1940 to 31 April 1943.

Cabinet

References

Ministries of the Parliament of Northern Ireland
1940 establishments in Northern Ireland
1943 disestablishments in the United Kingdom